Lajos Magyar (25 November 1891, Istvándi, Hungary – 17 July 1940, Moscow, Soviet Union) was a Hungarian Communist journalist and sinologist, active in the Hungarian Soviet Republic of 1919, after the fall of which he was imprisoned by the Horthy regime. In 1922 Magyar went to the Soviet Union as the result of an exchange of prisoners. There he worked on the staff of the Comintern and at the newspaper Pravda. Between 1926 and 1927 he was sent on a diplomatic mission to China. From 1929 to 1934 he served as deputy chief of the Oriental Secretariat of the Executive Committee of the Communist International.

In 1934, Magyar was falsely accused of being involved in the Kirov assassination; he was arrested and sentenced to prison convicted as a "Zinovievite-Terrorist". Magyar was sent to a gulag, where he ultimately perished. The "Guidebook to the Pantheon of the Working-Class Movement of the Imre Mező Avenue Cemetery" reports that Lajos Magyar died on July 17, 1940, but despite this, his wife never learned of the circumstances or even the date of his death.

References

Borsanyi, György. The life of a Communist revolutionary, Béla Kun: Distributed by Columbia University Press, 1993.

External links
 Lajos Magyar Archive at marxists.org

1891 births
1940 deaths
People from Somogy County
Hungarian Jews
Hungarian Comintern people
Executed Hungarian people
Jews executed by the Soviet Union
Jewish socialists
Hungarian Communist Party politicians
Hungarian expatriates in the Soviet Union
Great Purge victims from Hungary
Hungarian sinologists
Executed communists